The 2010 City of Ipswich 300 was the fifth race meeting of the 2010 V8 Supercar Championship Series. It contained Races 9 and 10 of the series and was held on the weekend of 1–2 May at Queensland Raceway, Ipswich, Queensland.

Background
The meeting appeared on early announced calendars, but was subsequently cancelled in January after V8 Supercar and circuit operators Queensland Raceways were unable to agree to terms. The Ipswich venue was later restored to the calendar in a deal brokered by Ipswich City Council mayor Paul Pisasale which saw the Council foot the bill for some of the previously unresolvable issues. Part of the resolution saw that the event was run for the first time by V8 Supercar Events rather than the circuit operators. Crowds however were the lowest ever seen for a V8 Supercar event at this circuit, a major factor was an accident in an Australian Mini Challenge race on Saturday which saw Kane Magro's Mini tumble over the fence and into the spectator area where two spectators were injured.

Results
Results as follows:

Qualifying Race 9

Qualifying timesheets:

Race 9

Race timesheets:

Qualifying Race 10

Qualifying timesheets:

Race 10

Race timesheets:

Standings
After race 10 of 26

Source

References

External links
Official series website
Official timing and results

City of Ipswich 300